Pimentel District is one of twenty districts of the Chiclayo province in Peru. The beach (Playa Pimentel) and reed watercraft caballitos de totora are among its most popular attractions.

Gallery

References

External links
 Tourism and the Town of Pimentel